Kanturk is a town in the north west of County Cork, Ireland. It is situated at the confluence of the Allua (Allow) and Dallow (Dalua) rivers, which stream further on as tributaries to the River Blackwater. Kanturk is within the Cork North-West Dáil constituency.

History
Located at a crossing point at the confluence of the River Allow and River Dalua, evidence of ancient settlement near Kanturk includes a number of ringfort, holy well and fulacht fiadh sites in the surrounding townlands of Coolacoosane, Curragh, Greenane and Gurteenard.

To the south of the town, in Paal East townland, is Kanturk Castle. Known locally as the Old Court, this fortified house was built  for MacDonogh McCarthy as a defence against English settlers during the Plantation of Ireland. The building was a limestone rubble Tudor mansion four storeys high, 28 metres in length and 11 metres wide, with four towers of five storeys high and a height of 29 metres. The castle was never fully completed. Work stopped , reputedly because local English settlers were concerned that the structure was too large and fortified, and could be used as a base to attack them. Accordingly, the Privy Council in England ordered that building works be stopped. After changing hands several times in the intervening centuries, Kanturk Castle is now owned by An Taisce (the National Trust for Ireland), and is a designated National Monument.

As of 2015, there were 32 buildings or structures listed on the Record of Protected Structures for County Cork. These include a number of the town's bridges, which date to the late 18th and early 19th centuries. The larger religious and administrative buildings in Kanturk date to the early to mid-19th century, including the former market house (1810), court house (1825), Church of Ireland church (1858), and Roman Catholic church (1867).

Economy and amenities
The local creamery, North Cork Creameries, was founded in 1928 and produces casein powder and other milk products.

Kanturk's library offers lending facilities, newspapers, reference books, internet access and also organises cultural events.

Kanturk Town Park is a short distance from the town shopping centre. The "Unity Stone" monument is located near the park's entrance. The park has oak, beech, chestnut and ash trees, a children's playground, some cultural exhibits, and a walkway by the banks of the Dalua.

The town's schools include a number of national (primary) schools and two co-educational secondary schools. The secondary schools, Coláiste Treasa and Scoil Mhuire, have enrollments of over 500 and 270 students respectively.

Sport
Kanturk GAA club has a hurling team and a football team, both men's and women's from underage to Intermediate level. The local pitch is located in Kilroe, just outside the town. Kanturk RFC is a rugby union club which is also located just outside the town, at Knocknacolan. Founded in 1927, the club plays in the All-Ireland League. An eighteen-hole golf course is located on Mill Road, where milling used to take place. The local association football soccer pitch has facilities to accommodate a number of teams. Kanturk also has a cycling club with its own outdoor 250m velodrome, one of only three on the island of Ireland.

Kanturk has a trout fishing club which maintains the rivers that flow through the town. From Newmarket, the Dalua river flows into the Allow (Freemount River) in the centre of the town. The Kanturk Trout Anglers Association has been represented on the international stage on several occasions, with past members participating at the World Fly Fishing Championships.

Transport

The town's one-time railway station opened on 1 April 1889, closed for passenger traffic on 27 January 1947 and finally closed altogether on 4 February 1963.

Bus routes serving Kanturk include weekday services to Mallow, one of which continues to Cork. On Saturdays, there is a single bus service to Cork via Mallow. Kanturk is not served by bus on Sundays.

People
 
People of note from the area include:
 Pat O'Callaghan, (1905–1991), twice Olympic gold medal winner and medical doctor
 Jackie Daly (b.1945), Irish musician
 Patrick Guiney (1862–1913), agrarian agitator and nationalist MP from 1910 to 1913
 Philip Francis Johnson (1835-1926), politician, labour activist and local hotel proprietor
 Sean P. Keating (1903–1976), IRA member who became Deputy Mayor of New York City
 Thady Quill (1860–1932), historical rake
 Edel Quinn (1907–1944), missionary worker declared Venerable in 1994
 D. D. Sheehan (1874–1948), labour activist and parliamentarian MP from 1901 to 1918
 Hanna Sheehy-Skeffington (1877–1946), suffragette and author
 Pádraig A. Ó Síocháin (1905–1995), author and Irish language activist
 Barry Yelverton, 1st Viscount Avonmore (1736–1805), politician and judge

See also
 List of towns and villages in Ireland
 Market Houses in Ireland

Notes

External links

Kanturk Town website

 
Towns and villages in County Cork